The taxonomy of the animals presented by Hutchins et al. in 2003 in Grzimek's Animal Life Encyclopedia is a system of classification which covers all the metazoans, from phyla to orders (or families, for Hexapoda and Pisces, or species, for Amphibia, Reptilia, Aves and Mammalia).

Animalia (= Metazoa)

Phylum Porifera

Phylum Porifera
Class Calcarea
Order Baeriida
Order Clathrinida
Order Leucosoleniida
Order Lithonida
Order Murrayonida
Class Hexactinellida
Order Amphidiscosida
Order Aulocalycoida
Order Hexactinosida
Order Lychniscosida
Order Lyssacinosida
Class Demospongiae
Order Agelasida
Order Astrophorida
Order Chondrosida
Order Dendroceratida
Order Dictyoceratida
Order Hadromerida
Order Halichondrida
Order Halisarcida
Order Haplosclerida
Order Homosclerophorida
Order Poecilosclerida
Order Spirophorida
Order Verongida
Order Verticillitida

Phylum Placozoa

Phylum Placozoa
No order designations

Phylum Monoblastozoa

Phylum Monoblastozoa
No order designations

Phylum Rhombozoa

Phylum Rhombozoa
Order Dicyemida
Order Heterocyemida

Phylum Orthonectida
Phylum Orthonectida
Order Orthonectida

Phylum Cnidaria
Phylum Cnidaria
Class Anthozoa
Order Actiniaria
Order Alcyonacea
Order Antipatharia
Order Ceriantharia
Order Corallimorpharia
Order Helioporacea
Order Pennatulacea
Order Scleractinia
Order Zoanthidea
Class Hydrozoa
Order Actinulida
Order Capitata
Order Conica
Order Cystonectae
Order Filifera
Order Laingiomedusae
Order Limnomedusae
Order Moerisiida
Order Narcomedusa
Order Proboscoida
Order Physonectae
Order Polypodiozoa
Order Trachymedusa
Class Cubozoa
Order Cubomedusae
Class Scyphozoa
Order Coronatae
Order Rhizostomeae
Order Semaeostomeae
Order Stauromedusae

Phylum Ctenophora
Phylum Ctenophora
Order Beroida
Order Cestida
Order Cydippida
Order Ganeshida
Order Lobata
Order Platyctenida
Order Thalassocalycida

Phylum Platyhelminthes
Phylum Platyhelminthes
Class Acoela
No order designations
Class Turbellaria
Order Catenulida
Order Haplopharyngida
Order Lecithoepitheliata
Order Macrostomida
Order Polycladida
Order Prolecithophora
Order Proplicastomata
Order Proseriata
Order Rhabdocoela
Order Tricladida
Class Trematoda
Order Aspidogastrida
Order Azygiida
Order Echinostomida
Order Opisthorchiida
Order Plagiorchiida
Order Strigeatida
Class Monogenea
Order Monopisthocotylea
Order Polyopisthocotylea
Class Cestoda
Order Amphilinidea
Order Caryophyllidea
Order Cyclophyllidea
Order Diphyllidea
Order Gyrocotylidea
Order Haplobothriidea
Order Lecanicephalidea
Order Litobothriidea
Order Nippotaeniidea
Order Proteocephalidea
Order Pseudophyllidea
Order Spathebothriidea
Order Tetrabothriidea
Order Tetraphyllidea
Order Trypanorhyncha

Phylum Nemertea 
Phylum Nemertea
Class Anopla
Order Heteronemertea
Order Palaeonemertea
Class Enopla
Order Hoplonemertea

Phylum Rotifera 
Phylum Rotifera
Order Bdelloida
Order Collothecacea
Order Flosculariacea
Order Ploimida
Order Seisonida

Phylum Gastrotricha
Phylum Gastrotricha
Order Chaetonotida
Order Macrodasyida

Phylum Kinorhyncha
Phylum Kinorhyncha
Order Cyclorhagida
Order Homalorhagida

Phylum Nematoda
Phylum Nematoda
Class Adenophorea
Order Araeolaimida
Order Chromadorida
Order Desmodorida
Order Desmoscolecida
Order Dorylaimida
Order Enoplida
Order Isolaimida
Order Mermithida
Order Monhysterida
Order Mononchida
Order Muspiceida
Order Stichosomida
Order Trichocephalida
Class Secernentea
Order Aphelenchida
Order Ascaridida
Order Camallanida
Order Diplogasterida
Order Rhabditida
Order Spirurida
Order Strongylida
Order Tylenchida

Phylum Nematomorpha

Phylum Nematomorpha
Order Gordioidea
Order Nectonematoidea

Phylum Acanthocephala
Phylum Acanthocephala
Order Apororhynchida
Order Echinorhynchida
Order Gigantorhynchida
Order Gyracanthocephala
Order Moniliformida
Order Neoechinorhynchida
Order Oligacanthorhynchida
Order Polymorphida

Phylum Entoprocta
Phylum Entoprocta
Order Coloniales
Order Solitaria

Phylum Micrognathozoa
Phylum Micrognathozoa
Order Limnognathida

Phylum Gnathostomulida 

Phylum Gnathostomulida
Order Bursovaginoidea
Order Filospermoidea

Phylum Priapulida
Phylum Priapulida
Order Halicryptomorphida
Order Priapulimorphida
Order Seticoronarida

Phylum Loricifera
Phylum Loricifera
Order Nanaloricida

Phylum Cycliophora
Phylum Cycliophora
Order Symbiida

Phylum Echinodermata
Phylum Echinodermata
Class Crinoidea
Order Bourgueticrinida
Order Comatulida
Order Cyrtocrinida
Order Isocrinida
Order Millericrinida
Class Asteroidea
Order Brisingida
Order Forcipulatida
Order Notomyotida
Order Paxillosida
Order Spinulosida
Order Valvatida
Order Velatida
Class Concentricycloidea
Order Peripodida
Class Ophiuroidea
Order Euryalida
Order Oegophiurida
Order Ophiurida
Class Echinoidea
Order Arbacioida
Order Cassiduloida
Order Cidaroida
Order Clypeasteroida
Order Diadematoida
Order Echinoida
Order Echinothuroida
Order Holasteroida
Order Holectypoida
Order Pedinoida
Order Phymosomatoida
Order Salenoida
Order Spatangoida
Order Temnopleurida
Class Holothuroidea
Order Apodida
Order Aspidochirotida
Order Dactylochirotida
Order Dendrochirotida
Order Elasipodida
Order Molpadiida

Phylum Chaetognatha
Phylum Chaetognatha
Order Aphragmophora
Order Phragmophora

Phylum Hemichordata
Phylum Hemichordata
Order Cephalodiscida
Order Rhabdopleurida

Phylum Chordata
Phylum Chordata
Subphylum Urochordata
Class Ascidiacea
Order Enterogona
Order Pleurogona
Class Thaliacea
Order Doliolida
Order Pyrosomatida
Order Salpida
Class Appendicularia
Order Copelata
Class Sorberacea
Order Aspiraculata
Subphylum Cephalochordata
Order Amphioxiformes
Subphylum Craniata

Superclass Pisces

Superclass Pisces (polyphyletic)
Class Myxini
Order Myxiniformes
Class Cephalaspidomorphi 
Order Petromyzoniformes
Class Chondrichthyes
Order Chimaeriformes
Order Heterodontiformes
Order Orectolobiformes
Order Carcharhiniformes
Order Lamniformes
Order Hexanchiformes
Order Squaliformes
Order Squatiniformes
Order Pristiophoriformes
Order Rajiformes
Class Sarcopterygii
Order Coelacanthiformes
Order Ceratodontiformes
Order Lepidosireniformes
Class Actinopterygii
Order Polypteriformes
Order Acipenseriformes
Order Lepisosteiformes
Order Amiiformes
Order Osteoglossiformes
Order Elopiformes
Order Albuliformes
Order Anguilliformes
Order Saccopharyngiformes
Order Clupeiformes
Order Gonorynchiformes
Order Cypriniformes
Order Characiformes
Order Siluriformes
Order Gymnotiformes
Order Esociformes
Order Osmeriformes
Order Salmoniformes
Order Stomiiformes
Order Aulopiformes
Order Myctophiformes
Order Lampridiformes
Order Polymixiiformes
Order Percopsiformes
Order Ophidiiformes
Order Gadiformes
Order Batrachoidiformes
Order Lophiiformes
Order Mugiliformes
Order Atheriniformes
Order Beloniformes
Order Cyprinodontiformes
Order Stephanoberyciformes
Order Beryciformes
Order Zeiformes
Order Gasterosteiformes
Order Synbranchiformes
Order Scorpaeniformes
Order Perciformes
Suborder Percoidei
Suborder Labroidei
Suborder Zoarcoidei
Suborder Nototheniodei
Suborder Trachinoidei
Suborder Blennioidei
Suborder Icosteoidei
Suborder Gobiesocoidei
Suborder Callionymoidei
Suborder Gobioidei
Suborder Acanthuroidei
Suborder Scombroidei
Suborder Stromateoidei
Suborder Anabantoidei
Suborder Channoidei
Order Pleuronectiformes
Order Tetraodontiformes

Class Amphibia
Class Amphibia
Order Anura
Order Caudata
Order Gymnophiona

Class Reptilia

Class Reptilia
Order Testudines
Order Crocodylia
Order Rhynchocephalia
Order Squamata

Class Aves
Class Aves
Order Struthioniformes
Order Procellariiformes
Order Sphenisciformes
Order Gaviiformes
Order Podicipediformes
Order Pelecaniformes
Order Ciconiiformes
Order Phoenicopteriformes
Order Falconiformes
Order Anseriformes
Order Galliformes
Order Opisthocomiformes
Order Gruiformes
Order Charadriiformes
Order Pterocliformes
Order Columbiformes
Order Psittaciformes
Order Musophagiformes
Order Cuculiformes
Order Strigiformes
Order Caprimulgiformes
Order Apodiformes
Order Coliiformes
Order Trogoniformes
Order Coraciiformes
Order Piciformes
Order Passeriformes

Class Mammalia
Class Mammalia
Order Monotremata
Order Didelphimorphia
Order Paucituberculata
Order Microbiotheria
Order Dasyuromorphia
Order Peramelemorphia
Order Notoryctemorphia
Order Diprotodontia
Order Xenarthra
Order Insectivora
Order Scandentia
Order Dermoptera
Order Chiroptera
Order Primates
Order Carnivora
Order Cetacea
Order Tubulidentata
Order Proboscidea
Order Hyracoidea
Order Sirenia
Order Perissodactyla
Order Artiodactyla
Order Pholidota
Order Rodentia
Order Lagomorpha
Order Macroscelidea

Phylum Annelida
Phylum Annelida
Class Polychaeta
Order Amphinomida
Order Capitellida
Order Chaetopterida
Order Cirratulida
Order Cossurida
Order Ctenodrilida
Order Dinophilida
Order Eunicida
Order Flabelligerida
Order Magelonida
Order Nerillida
Order Opheliida
Order Orbiniida
Order Oweniida
Order Phyllodocida
Order Poeobiida
Order Polygordiida
Order Protodrilida
Order Psammodrilida
Order Sabellariida
Order Sabellida
Order Spintherida
Order Spionida
Order Sternaspida
Order Terebellida
Class Myzostomida
Order Pharyngidea
Order Proboscidea
Class Oligochaeta
Order Haplotaxida
Order Lumbriculida
Order Moniligastrida
Order Opisthopora
Class Hirudinea
Order Arhynchobdellae
Order Rhynchobdellida
Class Pogonophora
Order Athecanephria
Order Thecanephria

Phylum Vestimentifera
Phylum Vestimentifera
Order Basibranchia
Order Riftiidae

Phylum Sipuncula
Phylum Sipuncula
Order Aspidosiphoniformes
Order Golfingiaformes
Order Phascolosomatiformes
Order Sipunculiformes

Phylum Echiura
Phylum Echiura
Order Bonellioinea
Order Echiuroinea
Order Heteromyota
Order Xenopneusta

Phylum Onychophora
Phylum Onychophora
Class Udeonychophora

Phylum Tardigrada
Phylum Tardigrada
Order Arthrotardigrada
Order Echiniscoidea
Order Parachela
Order Apochela
Order Mesotardigrada

Phylum Arthropoda

Phylum Arthropoda

Subphylum Crustacea
Subphylum Crustacea
Class Remipedia
Order Nectiopoda
Class Cephalocarida
Order Brachypoda
Class Branchiopoda
Order Anostraca
Order Notostraca
Order Conchostraca
Order Cladocera
Class Malacostraca
Subclass Phyllocarida
Order Leptostraca
Subclass Eumalacostraca
Order Stomatopoda
Order Bathynellacea
Order Anaspidacea
Order Euphausiacea
Order Amphionidacea
Order Decapoda
Order Mysida
Order Lophogastrida
Order Cumacea
Order Tanaidacea
Order Mictacea
Order Spelaeogriphacea
Order Thermosbaenacea
Order Isopoda
Order Amphipoda
Class Maxillopoda
Subclass Thecostraca
Order Acrothoracica
Order Ascothoracica
Order Rhizocephala
Order Thoracica
Subclass Tantulocarida
No order designations
Subclass Branchiura
Order Arguloida
Subclass Mystacocarida
No order designations
Subclass Copepoda
Order Calanoida
Order Cyclopoida
Order Gelyelloida
Order Harpacticoida
Order Misophrioida
Order Monstrilloida
Order Mormonilloida
Order Platycopioida
Order Siphonostomatoida
Subclass Ostracoda
Order Myodocopida
Order Palaeocopida
Order Podocopida
Class Pentastomida
Order Cephalobaenida
Order Porocephalida

Subphylum Cheliceriformes

Subphylum Cheliceriformes
Class Pycnogonida
Order Pantopoda
Class Chelicerata
Subclass Merostomata
Order Xiphosura
Subclass Arachnida
Order Acari
Order Amblypygi
Order Araneae
Order Opiliones
Order Palpigradi
Order Pseudoscorpiones
Order Ricinulei
Order Schizomida
Order Scorpionida
Order Solpugida
Order Uropygi

Subphylum Uniramia
Subphylum Uniramia
Class Myriapoda
Subclass Chilopoda
Order Craterostigmomophora
Order Geophilomorpha
Order Lithobiomorpha
Order Scolopendromorpha
Order Scutigeromorpha
Subclass Diplopoda
Order Callipodida
Order Chordeumatida
Order Glomerida
Order Glomeridesmida
Order Julida
Order Platydesmida
Order Polydesmida
Order Polyxenida
Order Polyzoniida
Order Siphoniulida
Order Siphonophorida
Order Sphaerotheriida
Order Spirobolida
Order Spirostreptida
Order Stemmiulida
Subclass Symphyla
Order Symphyla
Subclass Pauropoda
Order Hexamerocerata
Order Tetramerocerata

Subphylum Hexapoda
Subphylum Hexapoda
Class Entognatha
Order Protura
Order Collembola
Order Diplura
Class Insecta
Order Microcoryphia
Order Thysanura
Order Ephemeroptera
Order Odonata
Order Plecoptera
Order Blattodea
Order Isoptera
Order Mantodea
Order Grylloblattodea
Order Dermaptera
Order Orthoptera
Order Mantophasmatodea
Order Phasmida
Order Embioptera
Order Zoraptera
Order Psocoptera
Order Phthiraptera
Order Hemiptera
Order Thysanoptera
Order Megaloptera
Order Raphidioptera
Order Neuroptera
Order Coleoptera
Order Strepsiptera
Order Siphonaptera
Order Diptera
Order Trichoptera
Order Lepidoptera
Order Hymenoptera

Phylum Mollusca
Phylum Mollusca
Class Aplacophora
Order Cavibelonia
Order Neomeniomorpha
Order Pholidoskepia
Class Monoplacophora
Order Tryblidioidea
Class Polyplacophora
Order Acanthochitonida
Order Ischnochitonida
Order Lepidopleurida
Class Gastropoda
Subclass Opisthobranchia
Order Acochlidioidea
Order Anaspidea
Order Cephalaspidea
Order Gymnosomata
Order Notaspidea
Order Nudibranchia
Order Runcinoidea
Order Sacoglossa
Order Thecosomata
Subclass Pulmonata
Order Actophila
Order Basommatophora
Order Stylommatophora
Order Systellommatophora
Order Patellogastropoda
Superorder Vetigastropoda
Order Haliotoidea
Order Lepetodriloidea
Order Vetigastropoda
Order Cocculiniformia
Order Neritopsina
Order Caenogastropoda
Class Bivalvia
Order Arcoida
Order Hippuritoida
Order Limoida
Order Myoida
Order Mytiloida
Order Nuculoida
Order Ostreoida
Order Pholadomyoida
Order Pterioida
Order Solemyoida
Order Trigonioida
Order Unionoida
Order Veneroida
Class Scaphopoda
Order Dentaliida
Order Gadilida
Class Cephalopoda
Order Nautilida
Order Octopoda
Order Sepioidea
Order Spirulida
Order Teuthoidea
Order Vampyromorphida

Phylum Phoronida
Phylum Phoronida
No order designations

Phylum Ectoprocta
Phylum Ectoprocta
Class Phylactolaemata
No order designations
Class Stenolaemata
Order Cyclostomata
Class Gymnolaemata
Order Cheilostomatida
Order Ctenostomata

Phylum Brachiopoda
Phylum Brachiopoda
Class Inarticulata
Order Acrotretida
Order Lingulida
Class Articulata
Order Rhynchonellida
Order Terebratulida
Order Thecideidina

References

Systems of animal taxonomy